Sean Franklin Lumpkin (born January 4, 1970) is a former American football safety in the National Football League (NFL) for the New Orleans Saints who drafted him out of the University of Minnesota. While at Minnesota Lumpkin played four years and accrued numerous awards:

1990: All Big Ten Second-team
1991: All Big-Ten First-team, Bronko Nagurski Award (Team MVP), Carl Eller Award (Outstanding Defensive Player), Captain

Lumpkin was the 106th player selected in the 1992 NFL Draft and played 67 games for the Saints between 1992 and 1996. He was released by the Saints in June 1997.

Lumpkin grew up in Golden Valley, Minnesota and graduated from Benilde-St. Margaret's School where he is one of a handful of notable alumni.

References 

1970 births
Living people
People from Golden Valley, Minnesota
American football safeties
Minnesota Golden Gophers football players
New Orleans Saints players
Players of American football from Minnesota
Sportspeople from the Minneapolis–Saint Paul metropolitan area